Dorolyn Lines (October 24, 1901January 17, 1975) was an American engineer known for her design of canal and irrigation systems in California, Yuma, the Missouri River basin, the Columbia River basin, the Lower Rio Grande, and Oregon. She was honored with a Certificate of Merit from the Bureau of Reclamation in 1966, and was remembered for her work in raising the status of women engineers.

References 

American women engineers
20th-century American engineers
20th-century women engineers
1901 births
1975 deaths
20th-century American women